Don't Close Your Eyes is an EP by Australian metalcore band Parkway Drive. It was released in 2004. It was later re-released with the addition of tracks included from both their split album with I Killed the Prom Queen and from the compilation albums What We've Built and True Till Death, Volume I. Two songs, "Smoke 'Em If Ya Got 'Em" and "Hollow Man", were re-recorded and released on Parkway Drive's  debut album Killing with a Smile and 2010 album Deep Blue, respectively. "Hollow Man" is released as just "Hollow" on Deep Blue, and features Marshall Lichtenwaldt, the vocalist of American hardcore punk band the Warriors.

This is the band's last release with bassist Brett "Lagg" Versteeg.

Track listing

Personnel
Parkway Drive
 Winston McCall – lead vocals
 Jeff Ling – lead guitar
 Luke "Pig" Kilpatrick – rhythm guitar
 Brett "Lagg" Versteeg – bass, clean vocals on tracks 4 and 10
 Ben "Gaz" Gordon – drums

Additional musicians
 Jessica Turman – guest vocals

Additional personnel
 Stuart Nevin – mixing (tracks 1–8)
 Brad Wann – mixing (tracks 9–14)
 William Bowden – re-mastering
 Ash Pederick – graphic design
 Andian Martin – photography

References

 

Parkway Drive albums
2004 debut EPs
Resist Records albums